María is a district of the province of Luya in Peru. Maria is located in the high mountain. Maria offers several attractive places for tourists as beautiful lagoons and several ruins of the culture Chachapoya. Also there is a big production of Craft. To come to Maria's District a car takes in the city of Chachapoyas. In this construction the highway from Maria towards the District of Cocabamba.

The management holidays of cardinal Maria it is celebrated on July 16. As typical meals are known by the Purtumote, the Nickname, the Locro, Tauri Hucho and Cuy with dads between others. Maria's District belongs to the parroquía of Magdalena's District (Chachapoyas).

In the north the District of Cocabamba has border with the District of Tingo and the District of Longuita, in the East with the District of Saint John of Lopecancha, in the south-west with the District of Cocabamba, in the southeast with the Saint's District Tomás (Luya), in the west with the District of Pisuquía.

Districts of the Luya Province
Districts of the Amazonas Region